The St. Paul Fighting Saints are a defunct professional ice hockey team. Based in Saint Paul, Minnesota, they played the 1992–93 season in the American Hockey Association. The Fighting Saints played home games at the Minnesota State Fair coliseum, now known as the  Warner Coliseum.

Coached by Dave Langevin, the team compiled a record of 21 wins, 5 losses, and 4 overtime losses in its only season of play. The league, along with all teams, suspended operations on January 29, 1993.

References

External links
 St. Paul Fighting Saints 1992-93 roster and scoring statistics at hockeydb.com
 "Forgotten" 1990's Fighting Saints–Vintage Minnesota Hockey (scroll to bottom)

Defunct ice hockey teams in Minnesota